The South Texas ICE Processing Center is a privately operated detention facility located in Pearsall, Frio County, Texas, run by the GEO Group to house detainees for the U.S. Immigration and Customs Enforcement.

The facility holds a maximum of 1904 detainees, male and female, at a mix of security levels.  The facility first opened in May 2005 as the "Pearsall Immigration Detention Center" by the Correctional Services Corporation, which was bought by the GEO Group later that year.

A 2015 report from watchdog organizations, Detention Watch Network and the Center for Constitutional Rights, showed that contracts between ICE and five detention facilities in Texas obligated ICE to pay for daily minimum populations. Detention Watch Network says this incentivized ICE  to fill the center up to the minimum, effectively creating a quota system.  The nightly minimum for this facility was 725, which was regularly exceeded.

See also
List of detention sites in the United States

References

External links 

 McLemore, D. South Texas Detention Center. 2004 description of ICE activities in South Texas, reproduced from Dallas Morning News

Prisons in Texas
Buildings and structures in Frio County, Texas
GEO Group
2005 establishments in Texas
Immigration detention centers and prisons in the United States
U.S. Immigration and Customs Enforcement